Bolivia competed at the 2016 Summer Olympics in Rio de Janeiro, Brazil, from 5 to 21 August 2016. This was the nation's fourteenth appearance at the Summer Olympics, since its debut in 1936.

Bolivian Olympic Committee ( sent the nation's second-largest delegation in history to the Games, falling short of a roster size set in Barcelona 1992 by a single athlete. A total of 12 athletes, six per gender, were selected to the Bolivian team across five different sports; three of them returned for their second appearance, while the rest of the delegation attended the Games for the first time.

Notable Bolivian athletes featured pistol shooter Rudolf Knijnenburg, who staged his comeback in Rio de Janeiro after a twelve-year absence, freestyle swimmer Karen Torrez, and race walkers Claudia Balderrama and Ángela Castro, who was chosen to lead the team as the nation's flag bearer into the opening ceremony. Bolivia, however, has yet to win its first ever Olympic medal.

Athletics (track and field)
 
Bolivian athletes have so far achieved qualifying standards in the following athletics events (up to a maximum of 3 athletes in each event):

Track & road events

Cycling

Road
Bolivia has received an invitation from the Tripartite Commission to send a rider competing in the men's road race to the Olympics.

Judo

Bolivia has qualified one judoka for the men's middleweight category (90 kg) at the Games, signifying the nation's Olympic return to the sport for the first time since 2004. Martin Michel earned a continental quota spot from the Pan American region as the Bolivia's top-ranked judoka outside of direct qualifying position in the IJF World Ranking List of 30 May 2016.

Shooting
 
Bolivia has received two invitations from the Tripartite Commission to send shooters competing in the men's pistol and women's rifle events to the Olympics.

Qualification Legend: Q = Qualify for the next round; q = Qualify for the bronze medal (shotgun)

Swimming

Bolivia has received a Universality invitation from FINA to send two swimmers (one male and one female) to the Olympics.

See also
Bolivia at the 2015 Pan American Games

References

External links 
 

Nations at the 2016 Summer Olympics
2016
2016 in Bolivian sport